Lester Robert Harvey (14 April 1919 – 3 June 1993) was a New Zealand rugby union player. A lock, Harvey represented  at a provincial level, and was a member of the New Zealand national side, the All Blacks, in 1949 and 1950. He played 22 matches for the All Blacks including eight internationals.

References

1919 births
1993 deaths
Rugby union players from Dunedin
People educated at Waitaki Boys' High School
New Zealand rugby union players
New Zealand international rugby union players
Otago rugby union players
Rugby union locks